The confiscation of Armenian properties by the Ottoman and Turkish governments involved seizure of the assets, properties and land of the country's Armenian community. Starting with the Hamidian massacres and peaking during the Armenian genocide, the confiscation of the Armenian property lasted continuously until 1974. Much of the confiscations during the Armenian genocide were made after the Armenians were deported into the Syrian Desert with the government declaring their goods and assets left behind as "abandoned". Virtually all properties owned by Armenians living in their ancestral homeland in Western Armenia  were confiscated and later distributed among the local Muslim population.

Historians argue that the mass confiscation of Armenian properties was an important factor in forming the economic basis of the Turkish Republic while endowing the Turkish economy with capital. The appropriation led to the formation of a new Turkish bourgeoisie and middle class.

History

Confiscation as part of the Armenian genocide 
On 16 May 1915, while the Armenian genocide was underway, a secret directive was promulgated entitled "administrative instruction regarding movable and immovable property abandoned by Armenians deported as a result of the war and unusual political circumstances." Once enacted, the directive established special commissions, known as the "Abandoned Property Commissions" (Turkish: Emvâl-i Metrûke İdare Komisyonları) and the "Liquidation Commissions" (Turkish: Tasfiye Komisyonu), which were tasked with providing detailed information and appraising the value of assets "abandoned" by deportees under the guise of "safeguarding" them. The number of these commissions rose to 33 by January 1916. After the departure of the deportees, goods and livestock that were deemed "perishable" were prioritized as the first items that must be sold using public auctions, while the profits from these auctions were to be safeguarded under the entitlement of the owners. After providing documentation of the property (copies provided to the owners and the Ottoman Treasury), the directive specified that muhajirs (Turkish refugees mainly from the Balkan wars) were to be settled in the vacant lands and properties belonging to the deportees. Once settled, the refugees had to register the land and houses, while other assets that were affixed to the property, such as olive groves and vineyards, were to be allocated amongst them. Unwanted items and assets were to be sold in public auctions. According to historian Dickran Kouymjian, the settlement of muhajirs into the lands and properties of deported Armenians implies that local authorities had firsthand knowledge that the deportees were to never return.

On 29 May 1915, the Committee of Union and Progress (CUP) Central Committee passed the Tehcir Law authorizing the deportation of "persons judged to be a threat to national security." The Tehcir Law emphasized that the deportees must not sell their assets, but instead provide a detailed list and submit the list to the local authorities:

While the Tehcir law was being carried out, the Directorate for the Settlement of Tribes and Refugees (Turkish: Iskan-i Asairin Muhacirin Muduriyeti), under the Ministry of Internal Affairs, was tasked in June 1915 to deal with the property left behind by deported or killed Armenians. This commission, whose salaries were provided by property confiscated by Armenians, produced the "Temporary Law of Expropriation and Confiscation ("Abandoned Properties" law) and published in the official register on 27 September (13 September according to the Islamic calendar) and passed a further directive for implementation of the law on 8 November. The objectives of the laws were simultaneously to reduce Armenian property ownership, enrich national politicians, and to resettle Turkish Muslim refugees in property which was seized. The property confiscated included personal property (including land, buildings, and bank accounts), businesses, and also community property (e.g. churches). Items that were considered useful for the immediacy of the war effort were prioritized and immediately confiscated with a separate decree. Under the law, property and asset transactions were forbidden prior to the deportation thereby preventing the owners from having the opportunity to keep his or her property. Although the law was called "Temporary", the provisions within it seemed to aim toward the permanent transformation of the ethnicity of communities from Armenian to Turkish Muslim.

These resettlement laws did contain formal reporting of property to national authorities and contained procedures for those who had property taken to sue, but the specifics of the law made these provisions serve the larger goal to "Turkify" regions and economic sectors. The property records and revenue generated from the sale or rent of confiscated property were all recorded and deposited with the Ministry of Financial Affairs to provide for the possible return of property to owners. In addition, the law provided that those whose property had been confiscated to sue for return of the property (and payment for any damages which occurred). However, the law required property owners to sue and be present themselves (not allowing the power of attorney), an impossibility when property owners had been killed or deported. In addition, the defendant in any case would be the state which made the chances of success in any lawsuit extremely unlikely. Finally, the law provided that the confiscated property be sold at auction; however, because the law specified that "anybody other than Turkish Muslim refugees can only acquire property in Turkey with the approval of the Ministry of Internal Affairs", the result was that non-Turkish Muslims were effectively excluded. Property was provided often to national and local political elites, who eventually gave them to Turkish Muslim refugees.

The impact of these laws were immediate. According to a report in June 1916 by the German ambassador stationed in Constantinople, the goods of the Armenians "have long since been confiscated, and their capital has been liquidated by a so-called commission, which means that if an Armenian owned a house valued at, say, £T100, a Turk – a friend or member [of the Ittihad and Terakki] – could have it for around £T2."

The only notable domestic opposition was by Ottoman parliamentary representative Ahmed Riza, who stated:
It is unlawful to designate the Armenian assets as "abandoned goods" for the Armenians, the proprietors, did not abandon their properties voluntarily; they were forcibly, compulsorily removed from their domiciles and exiled. Now the government through its efforts is selling their goods ... Nobody can sell my property if I am unwilling to sell it. Article 21 of the Constitution forbids it. If we are a constitutional regime functioning in accordance with constitutional law we can't do this. This is atrocious. Grab my arm, eject me from my village, then sell my goods and properties, such a thing can never be permissible. Neither the conscience of the Ottomans nor the law can allow it.

Formal directives were made to have much of the properties and businesses confiscated from the Armenians to be transferred into the hands of Muslims. On 6 January 1916, Talaat Pasha, the Interior Minister of the Ottoman Empire, decreed:

In addition to churches and monasteries, other community owned properties confiscated were schools and educational facilities. The Interior Ministry had ordered such educational facilities to be assigned to Muslims:

Following the decree, private Armenian schools became Ottoman Turkish schools and school supplies were distributed to the Turkish Muslim population. Abraham Harutiunian, a priest living in Zeitun, notes in his memoirs that the school in Zeitun was confiscated by the government and that "the Armenians no longer had any right to education, and the campus was now filled with hundreds of Turkish children."

By the early 1930s, all properties belonging to Armenians who were subject to deportation had been confiscated. Since then, no restitution of property confiscated during the Armenian genocide has taken place. The laws concerning abandoned property remained in effect for 73 years until it was finally abolished on 11 June 1986. The mass confiscation of properties provided the opportunity for ordinary lower class Turks (i.e. peasantry, soldiers, and laborers) to rise to the ranks of the middle class. Contemporary Turkish historian Uğur Ümit Üngör asserts that "the elimination of the Armenian population left the state an infrastructure of Armenian property, which was used for the progress of Turkish (settler) communities. In other words: the construction of an étatist Turkish "national economy" was unthinkable without the destruction and expropriation of Armenians."

Extent of Ottoman confiscation
Although the exact extent of confiscated property during the Armenian genocide is unknown, according to Talaat Pasha's private documents, the chief initiator of the Tehcir Law, a total of 20,545 buildings were confiscated including 267,536 acres of land along with other parcels of agricultural and tillable lands such as 76,942 acres of vineyards, 703,941 acres of olive groves, and 4,573 acres of mulberry gardens. Along with the confiscation of physical land, Ottoman state took over life insurance policies from the Armenians. Talaat Pasha justified Ottoman actions by stating that the Armenians were "practically all dead ... and have left no heirs to collect the money. It of course all escheats to the State. The Government is the beneficiary now."

During the Paris Peace Conference, the Armenian delegation presented an assessment of $3.7 billion (about $ billion today) worth of material losses owned solely by the Armenian church. During the conference in February 1920, the Armenian community presented an additional demand for the restitution of property and assets seized by the Ottoman government. The joint declaration, which was submitted to the Supreme Council by the Armenian delegation and prepared by the religious leaders of the Armenian community, claimed that the Ottoman government had destroyed 2,000 churches and 200 monasteries and had provided the legal system for giving these properties to other parties. The declaration also provided a financial assessment of the total losses of personal property and assets of both Turkish and Russian Armenia with 14,598,510,000 and 4,532,472,000 francs respectively; totaling to an estimated $ billion today. Furthermore, the Armenian community asked for the restitution of church owned property and reimbursement of its generated income. The Ottoman government never responded to this declaration and so restitution did not occur.

The issue of confiscated Armenian property came about in a number of treaties signed between the First Republic of Armenia and the Ottoman Empire.  Both the Treaty of Batum (signed 4 June 1918) and the Treaty of Sèvres (signed 10 August 1920) contained provisions related to the restitution for confiscated properties of Armenians. The Treaty of Sèvres under Article 144 specified that the Abandoned Property commissions and Liquidation commissions must be abolished and the laws of confiscation be annulled. Meanwhile, however, those who seized the assets and properties of Armenians turned to support the Turkish national movement since the dissolution of the Ottoman government would mean that the properties and assets would be protected under their name. Thus, on 8 May 1920, the first law promulgated by the newly established parliament was to pardon those charged of massacre and expropriation of property by the Turkish courts-martial of 1919-20. Furthermore, with the establishment of the Turkish republic and the signing of the Treaty of Lausanne (24 July 1923), the provisions of the Treaty of Sèvres eventually never took effect and the liquidation committees involved with the confiscation of Armenian property resumed operations.

In addition to confiscated property, large sums of money and precious metals belonging to Armenians were also seized and deposited into the treasuries of the Ottoman government or in various German or Austrian banks during the war. Such sums were believed to be withdrawn from the bank accounts of deported and killed Armenians. An official memorandum prepared by former British Prime Ministers Stanley Baldwin and H. H. Asquith was sent to then Prime Minister of Great Britain Ramsay MacDonald describing such seizures and deposits:

Much of the money deposits into banks and other financial institutions have also been subsequently seized in the immediate aftermath of the deportations. Once a deposit was made, a certificate was given to the depositor as a proof of deposit. However, once the deportations began, withdrawals were prohibited. Much of the deportees who had held deposits were left with only certificates in their possession. Many of the depositors still carry the certificates of deposit today. Historian Kevork Baghdjian states that the worth of these deposits "should rise to astronomical sums today," with the "deposited capital and interests combined."

Confiscation during the Turkish Republic 

Following the Turkish War of Independence and the creation of the Republic of Turkey in 1923, the confiscation resumed with most Armenians having been deported or killed. During the early Republican era, the legal terminology of those deported was changed from "transported persons" to "persons who lost or fled from the country."

On 15 April 1923, just before the signing of the Treaty of Lausanne, the Turkish government enacted the "Law of Abandoned Properties" which confiscated properties of any Armenian who was not present on their property, regardless of the circumstances of the reason. While local courts were authorized to appraise the value of any property and provide an avenue for property owners to make claims, the law prohibited the use of any power of attorney by absent property holders, preventing them from filing suit without returning to the country. In addition, the defendant in the case would be the state of Turkey which had created specially tasked committees to deal with each case.

In addition to this law, the Turkish government continued revoking the citizenship of many people with a law on 23 May 1927 which stated that "Ottoman subjects who during the War of Independence took no part in the National movement, kept out of Turkey and did not return from 24 July 1923 to the date of the publication of this law, have forfeited Turkish nationality." Additionally, a further law passed on 28 May 1928 stipulated that those who had lost their citizenship would be expelled from Turkey, not allowed to return, and that their property would be confiscated by the Turkish government, and Turkish migrants would be resettled in the properties. 

In the preparation for possible entry into World War II, the Turkish government introduced a tax, the Varlık Vergisi, which disproportionately targeted Turkey's non-Muslim residents. Many Armenians, and other non-Muslim populations, were forced to sell their property at significantly reduced prices through public auctions in order to pay for the sudden tax hike or have the properties confiscated by the state. In addition, the law allowed authorities to confiscate the property of any relative of a taxed person in order to pay the tax. From this tax, the Turkish government collected 314,900,000 liras or about US$270 million (80% of the state budget) from the confiscation of non-Muslim assets.

This period coincided with further confiscations of private property belonging to Armenians. Special commissions were created to separate the evictions of non-Muslims from others. The investigators of this commission usually expedited the evacuation and eventual confiscation of the non-Muslim property in question.

The Varlık Vergisi was followed by the Istanbul pogrom a few years later, where an organized mob attacked Greeks and Armenians on 6–7 September 1955. The material damage was considerable, with damage to 5317 properties (including 4214 homes, 1004 businesses, 73 churches, 2 monasteries, 1 synagogue, and 26 schools). Estimates of the economic cost of the damage range from the Turkish government's estimate of 69.5 million Turkish lira (equivalent to 24.8 million US$), the British estimate of 100 million GBP (about 200 million US$), the World Council of Churches' estimate of 150 million US$, and the Greek government's estimate of 500 million US$. The pogrom eventually led to an exodus of non-Muslims from the country, resulting in a significant amount of "abandoned" properties. The properties left behind by those who fled were confiscated by the Turkish state after ten years.

In the 1960s, new laws were passed, which made it impossible for Armenians to establish new foundations or to buy or bequeath additional properties. One such law code (Law no. 903) adopted in 1967, along with a second paragraph amended to the Turkish Civil Code (no. 743) declared that, "The registration of foundations that are in violation of law, morality, tradition or national interests, or that were established to support a political belief, a certain race or members of a minority will not be approved." Such laws are considered by legal experts as a violation of articles concerning minority rights found in the Treaty of Laussane, the Turkish constitution, and Article 11 of the European Convention on Human Rights, which grants the "freedom to establish foundations and hold meetings." The new amendment and law code became the basis for a new series of confiscations that significantly obstructed the daily lives of Armenians in Turkey.

In 1974 new legislation was passed that stated that non-Muslim trusts could not own more property than that which had been registered under their name in 1936. As a result, more than 1,400 assets (included churches, schools, residential buildings, hospitals, summer camps, cemeteries, and orphanages) of the Istanbul Armenian community since 1936 were retrospectively classified as illegal acquisitions and seized by the state. Under the legislation, the Turkish courts rendered Turkish citizens of non-Turkish descent as "foreigners", thereby placing them under the same legal regulations of any foreign company or property holder living outside of Turkey who was not a Turkish national. The provisions further provided that foundations belonging to non-Muslims are a potential "threat" to national security. The process involved returning any property acquired after 1936, whether through lottery, will, donation, or purchase, to their former owners or inheritors. If former owners had died leaving no inheritors, the property was to be transferred to specified governmental agencies such as the Treasury or the Directorate General of Foundations.

On 11 June 1986, the laws concerning "abandoned" properties during the Armenian genocide were abrogated, which ended 73 years of effectiveness. Throughout the Republican period, the laws continued to provide a legal basis for the confiscation of additional property that belonged to the deportees. Though the laws were abolished in 1986, the General Directorate of Land Registry and Cadastre (Turkish: Tapu ve Kadastro Genel Müdürlüğü) issued an order on 29 June 2001 which effectively transferred all the leftover "abandoned" properties to the government. The order also forbid the disclosure of any information regarding the title or the documentation of the properties. As a result, the owners or their heirs could not make claims to the property since it was now securely sanctioned under Turkish law and had become property of the state.

Current developments

Terminology of former legislation and civil codes have not significantly changed since the 1960s and 70s, ultimately subjugating the assets and properties of the Armenian community to further confiscations. Though terminology has slightly changed, the current civil codes still have enough executive powers to confiscate property under the basis of protecting the "national unity" of the Republic of Turkey.

Due to such regulations and law codes, no church was ever constructed in the history of the Republic of Turkey. All churches in existence today were built before the establishment of the Republic in 1923. A permit for the construction of a Syriac church was granted in December 2012, however, it was refused by the Assyrian community since the land used to be a Latin cemetery.

In an attempt by the ruling Justice and Development Party (AKP) to comply with European Union standards, the opening up of the Ottoman land registry and deed records to the public were considered. However, on 26 August 2005, the National Security Committee of the Turkish Armed Forces forbid such attempts by stating:

On 15 June 2011, the United States House Foreign Affairs Committee of the 112th Congress passed House Resolution 306 by a vote of 43 to one which demanded from the Republic of Turkey "to safeguard its Christian heritage and to return confiscated church properties." Turkish-American organizations attempted to block the bill from passing but ultimately failed.

Contemporary analysis

Istanbul
After two years of research, the Hrant Dink Foundation published a book, some 400 pages long, describing the current situation of seized assets and properties of the Armenian community. With the help of government deed and title records, the members of the Hrant Dink foundation have uncovered the title records of all the properties owned by various foundations and have produced the book replete with photographs, charts, maps, and other illustrations which describe the seized properties and assets and its current status. The Hrant Dink foundation states that 661 properties in Istanbul alone were confiscated by the Turkish government, leaving only 580 of the 1,328 properties owned by the 53 Armenian foundations (schools, churches, hospitals, etc.). The current circumstances of the remaining 87 could not be determined. Out of the 661 confiscated properties, 143 (21.6%) have been returned to the Armenian foundation.

The Hrant Dink foundation researched confiscations and provided descriptions, photographs and boundary lines on its online interactive mapping resource.

Notable confiscations

See also
Anti-Armenian sentiment in Turkey
Armenian genocide reparations
Varlık Vergisi
Armenian cultural heritage in Turkey

References
Notes

References

Bibliography

 - Profile at Google Books
 - Profile at Google Books

External links

Hrant Dink Foundation: Website dedicated to the confiscation of properties. Site includes maps, detailed history, and status.
(YouTube Video) Prof. Ugur Ungor Discusses Property Confiscation During the Armenian Genocide (30 April 2012)

Anti-Armenianism in Turkey
Aftermath of the Armenian genocide
Armenians from the Ottoman Empire
Armenian
Armenian
Armenian
Armenian
Armenian
Armenian
Modern history of Armenia
Armenian
Economic history of Turkey
 
Armenian